Moinul Ahsan Saber (born 26 May 1958) is a Bangladeshi fiction writer. He is the executive editor of weekly magazine Saptahik 2000, published from Dhaka. He also heads Dibya Prokash, a progressive publishing house in Bangladesh. He was awarded Bangla Academy Literary Award in 1996. For his contribution to Bengali language and literature, the Bangladesh government awarded him the Ekushey Padak, the country's second highest civilian honor in 2019.

Early life and career
Saber's father, Ahsan Habib, was a poet. Saber emerged as a writer and got breakthrough with the publication of his first novel Porasto Sahish in 1982.

Works

Books
 Porasto Sahish (The Defeated Horse-Keeper), 1982
 Aadmer Jonye Opeksha (Waiting for Adam), 1986
 Pathor Somoy (Frozen Time), 1989
 Char Torun Toruni (Four Teenage Boys and Girls), 1990
 Manush  Jekhane Jai Na (Where Man Doesn't Go), 1990
 Dharabahik Kahini (A Continuous Story), 1992
 Opeksha (Waiting), 1992
 Tumi  Amake Niye Jabe (You Will Take Me), 1993
 Kobej Lethel (Kobej, the Ruffian), 1993 
 Prem O Protishodh (Love and Revenge), 1993
 Songshar Japon (Family Life), 1997

Television drama
 Pathor Somoy, Bangladesh Television

Film
 Liliputera Ber Hobe (screenplay based on Gulliver's Travels)

References

External links
Prem By Moinul Ahsan Saber

1958 births
Living people
Bangladeshi male novelists
Bengali-language science fiction writers
Recipients of Bangla Academy Award
Recipients of the Ekushey Padak